Since the founding of the Honors Program at Drexel in 1991, Honors has been a vital presence on campus, developing into the self-standing Pennoni Honors College in 2002. The College sponsors initiatives that serve Honors Program students and the Drexel community at large. The College five distinct units that overlap in significant ways: the Honors Program serves selected high-achieving students with coursework and special programming; the Office of Undergraduate Research supports student research across the university and matches students with faculty mentors; the Center for Interdisciplinary Inquiry offers a changing series of cross-disciplinary courses as well as a program where qualified students can craft their own field of study; the Fellowships Office helps students prepare and apply for competitive grants and scholarships; and the Cultural Media Center offers students involvement with a nationally recognized online journal, The Smart Set, and a nationally distributed television talk show, The Drexel Interview. We also oversee an App Development Lab, made possible by the Chair of our Honors Advisory Board, Greg Bentley.

Honors Program 
The Honors Program, a department within the Pennoni Honors College, enhances the education of the top-achieving students at Drexel University by providing Honors students from every School and College with intellectual challenges inside and outside of the classroom. Students learn through interdisciplinary academic work and activities, and participate in Honors coursework, social and cultural activities, guest speaker and faculty events, and travel opportunities. Activities and leadership opportunities available to Honors students include: the Honors Student Advisory Committee, Honors Mentors, Orientation Leaders, Cluster Coordinators, the Honors Living Learning community, the annual Honors Alternative Spring Break trip.

Graduation with Honors
Most Honors students who complete the minimum requirements for membership are invited to graduate with Honors from the Pennoni Honors College. This achievement is noted as such on your official University transcript. Additionally, your name will be listed in the University Commencement Program as a Pennoni Honors College graduate.

In order to qualify for Graduation with Honors, you must successfully do the following: complete a minimum of 16 Honors Credits, complete one Honors Colloquia (a 3 credit, 300 level course) and maintain an overall GPA of 3.2 or higher. Any extra classes used for Honors credits must be completed with a B or higher. All Honors credits must be completed and confirmed prior to the June Honors Graduation date.

Honors Graduation with Distinction
Graduation with Distinction is the highest honor awarded by the Honors Program and the Pennoni Honors College to its most accomplished students. This achievement is noted as such on your official University transcript and your name will be listed in the University Commencement Program as a Pennoni Honors College Graduate with Distinction. 

In order to qualify for Graduation with Honors with Distinction, you must successfully do the following: complete a minimum of 24 Honors Credits, complere three Honors Colloquia, maintain an overall GPA of 3.5 or higher, and complete a senior capstone project with an A− or better.

Office of Undergraduate Research
The Office of Undergraduate Research supports faculty and students who participate in undergraduate research. The purpose of the Office is to facilitate the collaboration of faculty and students in research, scholarly work, or creative projects through the expansion and development of existing programs, the creation of innovative opportunities for such collaboration both at and beyond the University, and the integration of a culture of research into the educational experience provided by the University.

Fellowships Office 
The Drexel Fellowships Office supports students across the University in their applications for competitive national and international fellowships. The Office raises campus-wide awareness of opportunities and directly help students create strong applications through intensive individual advising and support.

Center for Interdisciplinary Inquiry 
The Center for Interdisciplinary Inquiry (CII) at Drexel University offers students several different opportunities to develop the “big-picture” thinking and analytical skills associated with cutting-edge interdisciplinary teaching and research. Located in the Pennoni Honors College, the CII comprises three programs: the Custom-Designed Major, The Symposium, and Travel-Integrated Courses.

Cultural Media Center 
The Cultural Media Center's mission is to create innovative publishing initiatives and develop new forms of cultural engagement both for students and audiences beyond Drexel. The Center provides various opportunities for professional writers, faculty and qualified student writers to employ critical thinking and creative expression. It also provide opportunities for student writers to engage in experiential learning, often resulting in publication. The Center produces the television show The Drexel InterView.

References

External links
Pennoni Honors College
Drexel University
with Distinction

Drexel University
Educational institutions established in 1991
1991 establishments in Pennsylvania